In linguistics, a sprachraum ("language area", plural sprachräume) is a geographical region where a common first language (mother tongue), with dialect varieties, or group of languages is spoken.

Characteristics
Many sprachräume are separated by national borders, whilst others are separated by oceans or ethnolinguistic boundaries.

The five major Western sprachräume (by number of speakers) are those of English, Spanish, French, Portuguese, and German.

The English sprachraum (Anglosphere) spans the globe, from the United Kingdom, Ireland, United States, Canada, Australia, and New Zealand to the many former British and American colonies where English has official language status alongside local languages, such as India, South Africa, and the Philippines.

The Spanish sprachraum, known as the Hispanosphere, originated in the Iberian Peninsula but today most Spanish speakers are in Hispanic America; of all countries with a majority of Spanish speakers, only Spain and Equatorial Guinea are outside the Americas. The United States, especially its Southwest region, is also considered to be part of the Hispanosphere. The majority of the country's over 40 million native Spanish speakers resided in the region as of 2016, and nearly 60 million Americans (~20% of the population) profess fluency in the language.

The French sprachraum, which also spans the globe, is known as La francophonie. It includes French-speaking Europe (France, southern Belgium, western Switzerland, Monaco, and Luxembourg) along with Francophone Africa, Quebec in Canada, parts of the United States (Louisiana and northern New England), French Caribbean, and some other previous French colonies such as former Indochina and Vanuatu. La Francophonie is also the short name of an international organisation composed of countries with French as either an official or cultural language.

The German sprachraum is mostly concentrated in Central Europe, specifically Germany, central and eastern Switzerland, Austria, Liechtenstein, Luxembourg, and the German-speaking Community of Belgium. A significant concentration of native German speakers is also found in Namibia, which was formerly a part of the German colonial empire and where German continues to be a national language.

The Portuguese sprachraum is referred to as the Lusophony. It is a cultural entity that includes the countries where Portuguese is the official language, and are culturally and linguistically linked to Portugal. The Lusophony spans Portugal, Brazil, Lusophone Africa, East Timor, and Macau. The Community of Portuguese Language Countries (Portuguese: Comunidade dos Países de Língua Portuguesa, abbreviated to CPLP) is the intergovernmental organisation among nations where Portuguese is an official language.

By extension, a sprachraum can also include a group of related languages. Thus the Scandinavian sprachraum includes Norway, Sweden, Denmark, Iceland, and the Faroe Islands, while the Finnic sprachraum is Finland, Estonia and adjacent areas of Scandinavia and Russia.

Even within a single sprachraum, there can be different, but closely related, languages, otherwise known as dialect continua. A classic example is the varieties of Chinese, which can be mutually unintelligible in spoken form, but are typically considered the same language (or, at least, closely related) and have a unified non-phonetic writing system. Arabic has a similar situation, but its writing system  (an abjad) reflects the pronunciation and grammar of a common literary language (Modern Standard Arabic).

Examples

Germanic languages
Anglosphere (the English-speaking world)
Dutch Language Union
List of territorial entities where German is an official language
Germanic Europe cluster (continental West Germanic and North Germanic)

Romance languages
Catalan Countries (the Catalan-speaking part of Europe)
List of territorial entities where French is an official language
List of countries and territories where Romanian is an official language
Hispanophone world (where Spanish is spoken)
Latin Europe
Lusofonia (the Lusophone world)

Other Indo-European languages
Hindi belt
Bengal
Slavisphere
Greater Iran (Persian and closely related languages)

Other languages
Arab world
Austronesia
Malay world
Sinophone (where various forms of Chinese is spoken)
Turkic countries

See also

Dachsprache
Dialect continuum
Lingua franca
Pluricentric language
Sprachbund
World language

References

Further reading
 Joachim Born, Sylvia Dickgießer: Deutschsprachige Minderheiten. Ein Überblick über den Stand der Forschung für 27 Länder. Institut für deutsche Sprache, Mannheim 1989, . 
 dtv-Atlas Deutsche Sprache. 15., durchgesehene und aktualisierte Auflage. Deutscher Taschenbuch Verlag, München 2005, . 
 Alfred Lameli: Strukturen im Sprachraum. Analysen zur arealtypologischen Komplexität der Dialekte in Deutschland. Berlin, Boston 2013, . 
 Wolfgang Viereck, Karin Viereck, Heinrich Ramisch: dtv-Atlas Englische Sprache. Deutscher Taschenbuch Verlag, München 2002, pp. 95–99.

Language geography
Dialectology